The Kessler community is a group of residential neighborhoods in Dallas, Texas (USA). Named after George E. Kessler, an American pioneer city planner and landscape architect who developed the Kessler Plan for the city of Dallas, the Kessler area is close to several major commercial districts including Downtown Dallas, Design District and Bishop Arts District. 

Kessler Park, a residential neighborhood first established in the 1920s, is the principal neighborhood of Kessler. Other neighborhoods in the area include East Kessler Park, Stevens Park Estates, West Kessler, and Kessler Plaza.

References 

Neighborhoods in Dallas